Bartłomiej Jamróz (born 15 December 1973) is a retired Polish football defender.

References

1973 births
Living people
Polish footballers
Garbarnia Kraków players
Wisła Kraków players
Hutnik Nowa Huta players
Ruch Chorzów players
Górnik Polkowice players
Alki Larnaca FC players
APOEL FC players
Association football defenders
Polish expatriate footballers
Expatriate footballers in Cyprus
Polish expatriate sportspeople in Cyprus